Patalpur is a village in the Bhopal district of Madhya Pradesh, India. It is located in the Berasia tehsil, on the north-east border of the Berasia town. It is situated along the Madhya Pradesh State Highway 23, just north of the Berasia town.

Demographics 

According to the 2011 census of India, Patalpur has 3 households. The effective literacy rate (i.e. the literacy rate of population excluding children aged 6 and below) is 81.82%.

References 

Villages in Berasia tehsil